Sacred Heart High School is a missionary school located in the Indian city of Hyderabad. The school was established in 1983 and currently teaches students from preschool up until tenth grade.

2017 caning incident 
In November 2017, a teacher at Sacred Heart High School was arrested for brutally beating a student with a cane. The student was five years old and in Upper Kindergarten. According to the police, the student in question reportedly had a fight with one of his classmates and ended up biting him. The teacher then punished the student by beating him with a stick.

Child rights organization Balala Hakkula Sangham demanded that the school be closed and strict action taken against the school's administration.

Sports 
Sacred Heart High School has an outdoor sports program with an established cricket team. The school's cricket team was part of the elite group during the 2017-2018 Hyderabad Cricket Association inter-school league championship.

References 

Schools in Hyderabad, India
1983 establishments in Andhra Pradesh
Educational institutions established in 1983